|}

The Coral Trophy is a Premier Handicap National Hunt steeplechase in Great Britain which is open to horses aged five years or older. It is run at Kempton Park over a distance of about 3 miles, and during its running there are eighteen fences to be jumped. It is a handicap race, and it is scheduled to take place each year in late February.

The race was first run in 1949, but in 1988 it was rebranded as the Racing Post Chase and increased in value.  The sponsorship by the Racing Post continued until 2011. In the 2012 the sponsorship was taken over by rival weekend newspaper Racing Plus who backed the race until 2013, and in 2014 the sponsorship passed to BetBright. It was sponsored by Betdaq in 2018, 888sport in 2019, Betway in 2020 and Close Brothers Group in 2021. In 2022 Ladbrokes Coral took over the sponsorship. The race held Grade 3 status until 2022 and was re-classified as a Premier Handicap from the 2023 running when Grade 3 status was renamed by the British Horseracing Authority.

The race often serves as a trial for the Grand National, and two horses have won both races in the same year. Both of these horses, Rhyme 'n' Reason (1988) and Rough Quest (1996), also competed in the Cheltenham Gold Cup between their victories.

Records
Most successful horse (2 wins):
 Docklands Express – 1991, 1992
 Nacarat – 2009, 2012

Leading jockey (5 wins):
 Richard Johnson – Gloria Victis (2000), Young Spartacus (2001), Gunther McBride (2002), Farmer Jack (2005), Quinz (2011)

Leading trainer (4 wins):
 Peter Cazalet- Lochroe (1958), The Rip (1965), Kapeno (1966), Different Class (1968)
 Philip Hobbs – Dr Leunt (1999), Gunther McBride (2002), Farmer Jack (2005), Quinz (2011)

Winners
 Weights given in stones and pounds.

See also
 Horse racing in Great Britain
 List of British National Hunt races

References

Sources
 Racing Post:

 pedigreequery.com – Racing Post Chase – Kempton.

External links
 Race Recordings 

National Hunt races in Great Britain
Kempton Park Racecourse
National Hunt chases
Recurring sporting events established in 1949
1949 establishments in England